Angelin Chang (張安麟,  Korean: 장 安 린) is a Grammy award-winning classical pianist and professor of music at Cleveland State University. She heads the university's keyboard studies program and coordinates the university's chamber music program, and teaches music and law. Prior to joining Cleveland State, she was faculty at Rutgers University.

Chang's debut performance as a piano soloist was with the Muncie Symphony Orchestra, at age 12.  She is the first Artist-in-residence at the Kennedy Center in Washington D.C., and the first Academic Performing Artist for Yamaha Corporation of America.

Chang performed on and produced two of her CDs: Soaring Spirit (2004) and Angelín (2007). In , she won the Grammy award for the Best Instrumental Soloist Performance with Orchestra for her recording of Olivier Messiaen's Oiseaux exotiques (Exotic Birds) with the Cleveland Chamber Symphony, conducted by John McLaughlin Williams. She is the first female American classical pianist and the first pianist of Asian descent to win a Grammy.

Chang was born in Muncie, Indiana, and attended Burris Laboratory School there. Chang graduated with top honors from the Interlochen Arts Academy and received a Bachelor of Music from Ball State University, and a Master of Music degree, along with a distinguished Performer's Certificate, from Indiana University's Jacobs School of Music. She earned a Doctor of Musical Arts degree at Peabody Conservatory, at Johns Hopkins University. She is the first American awarded Premier Prix Piano and Premier Prix Musique de Chambre in the same year from the Conservatoire National Supérieur de Musique de Paris (France).

In addition to her musical degrees, Chang has a Bachelor of Arts degree in French from Ball State University and a Juris Doctor from the Cleveland State University College of Law. Chang is vice president and on the Board of Governors of The Recording Academy Chicago Chapter, serving as Chair of the Education Committee and Classical Task Force.

References

External links
 
 Faculty web page at Cleveland State University

Chicago Chapter at The Recording Academy

American classical pianists
American women classical pianists
American classical musicians of Chinese descent
American people of Taiwanese descent
Musicians from Indiana
Grammy Award winners

Living people
Year of birth missing (living people)
People from Muncie, Indiana
Ball State University alumni
Indiana University alumni
Johns Hopkins University alumni
Rutgers University faculty
Cleveland State University faculty
Cleveland–Marshall College of Law alumni

Ohio lawyers
Peabody Institute alumni
American women academics
American expatriates in France
21st-century American women